"Better Do Better" is the fifth single from English band Hard-Fi, taken from their 2005 debut album, Stars of CCTV. It was released on 10 April 2006, when it reached number 14 on the UK Singles Chart, sharing a similar chart success with all the other singles released from Stars of CCTV. The video was directed by Richard Skinner with Alex Smith acting as cinematographer. The Maxi CD version of the single contains exclusive U-MYX software to create a mix of "Hard to Beat". The song features in the Torchwood episode "Small Worlds".

History
Compared to the rest of the Stars of CCTV album, this song has a much darker feel which is most probably due to what the song is about and features saxophones and trumpets played by Kellie Santin and Nick Etwell. The track is about a relationship that's over. However it appears as if the girlfriend of Richard Archer wants to get back together after having an affair. The lyrics suggest he will have none of this "I'll tell you how it's gonna be, don't you never, ever come near me". While at times the speaker shows reflective emotions about the initial break up, he also seems quite angry and aggressive towards his ex, with the line "Your face makes me wanna be sick."

The B-side "Polish Love Song" was recorded in one take backstage at the Kansas City Grand Emporium. The song pleads the case for illegal immigrant workers coming from Eastern Europe.

Design
The single was created, designed and photographed by Aaron Hinchion and Matt Gibbins of communications agency ALBION. The CD cover opens up to give a bigger insight to the story told in the music. For Better Do Better it was about placing the phone in the appropriate context. The phone sits on a pub table and shows us that Tina is being deleted from the contacts list. The Tina mentioned on some of the sleeves formed a subplot throughout all the single releases, most notably on the cover for Better do Better, which probably suggests the girl in the song is "Tina". She later became a bit of a talking point both in the music press and on the fan forums. The Hard-Fi CCTV camera icon also appeared subtly on every cover in different forms.

Like all of the Hard-Fi releases, various formats carried subtle changes to differentiate them on the shelf. Making them all collectable. Better Do Better's delete message was in various stages of completion on the CD cover and 7-inch sleeve.

Track listings
CD single
 Better Do Better
 Polish Love Song

Maxi CD
 Better Do Better
 Polish Love Song
 Better Do Better (Video)
 Hard To Beat (U-MYX Format)

7-inch
 Better Do Better
 Better Do Better (Wrongtom Wild Inna 81 Version)

Charts

References

External links
 
 

Hard-Fi songs
2006 singles
Atlantic Records singles
Songs about domestic violence
Songs written by Richard Archer